Boloceroides daphneae is a cnidarian which occurs in the depths of the East Pacific Rise and was described in 2006.

Taxonomy
While the species is currently recognized as a sea anemone, a phylogenetic study was completed in 2014, in which three genes of mitochondrial DNA and two genes from the nucleus of over a hundred different sea anemones were compared, suggesting that the species instead belongs in a new order. A new genus, Relicanthus, was named to accommodate this alternate classification. The specific name daphneae is after Daphne Gail Fautin, "in honor of her contributions to actinarian systematics."

In December 2019 the American Museum of Natural History announced that research had placed it in a new suborder of Actiniaria, rather than a new order.

Description
B. daphneae has a pink-colored cylindrical body capable of reaching a metre across, with long, thin, whitish tentacles up to two meters in length. The body is divided into 24 septa. The muscles of the mesenteries are less developed. The spirocysts, which are stinging cells in which the stinging tube is spirally rolled up and which are covered with adhesive threads instead of spines, are significantly larger than those of any other deep-sea species and among the largest of all cnidarians.

Habitat and range
Its habitat is the ocean floor, peripheral to hydrothermal vents. Its range is known to be in the Eastern Pacific (the type specimen was taken from the Lau Basin) but may extend beyond that.

The type specimen was collected by the submersible DSV Alvin.

References

Boloceroididae
Animals living on hydrothermal vents
Animals described in 2006
Cnidarians of the Pacific Ocean